Hengelo is a city in the eastern part of the Netherlands, in the province of Overijssel. The city lies along the motorways A1/E30 and A35 and it has a station for the international Amsterdam – Hannover – Berlin service.

Population centres
Beckum
Oele
Hengelo

Transport
Hengelo is easily reached by train. One can travel from Hengelo railway station, the main station of Hengelo and get directly and regularly to:

Apeldoorn, Amersfoort, Hilversum, Southern Amsterdam, Amsterdam Airport Schiphol, Utrecht, Gouda, Rotterdam, The Hague, Zwolle, Zutphen, Oldenzaal, Almelo, Deventer, Enschede. There are international trains daily to Bad Bentheim, Rheine, Osnabrück, Hannover, and Berlin.

For information on the train services see Hengelo railway station. One can also plan a journey on the website of Dutch Railways.
For Amsterdam, passengers should use the train to Schiphol and change at Amersfoort, where there are regular trains to Amsterdam Centraal railway station, which is the nearest station to the city.

Hengelo Oost railway station and Hengelo Gezondheidspark railway station are also located in Hengelo. Just beside Hengelo Oost railway station is the football club Juliana '32 and the Groot Driene tennis club.

Within the city limits, the only means of public transport is the bus. Some parts of the route are on bus lanes, specifically built for buses to travel faster.
The A1/E30 from Amsterdam to Moscow goes right through the city.
The A35 from Enschede to Wierden goes along the west side of the city.
Hengelo has a relatively large harbour in the Twentekanaal, a heavily used canal from the Twente region to the IJssel.

The town of Hengelo
Although archeological research indicates the location has been inhabited for thousands of years, the municipality was founded in 1802. At that time it merely consisted of a few hundred farms and agricultural workers' houses.

Hengelo was never granted city rights as it was only a small village that expanded in the 19th century during the industrial revolution. In the late 19th century it rapidly developed after the construction of an important railway junction. This attracted industry with a focus on technology: Stork B.V., Hazemeyer, N.V. Heemaf (now part of France's Alstom, Brush HMA, Brush-Barclay, Eaton Corporation, Essent, Heemaf BV, Vattenfall, and Wabtec), KHZ (now AkzoNobel), and Hollandse Signaal Apparaten, now taken over by the Thales Group. Hengelo was the home town of Hengelo Bier, a local brewery. Nowadays, the beer brand Twents is produced in Hengelo, brewed by De Twentse Bierbrouwerij. This brewery was founded in 2007 and was until 2019 located in the monumental factory complex Hazemeijer.

During World War II, the city was often bombed by the Allies because of the presence of the railways and the war industry activities of local factories. The heart of the town was accidentally destroyed during the Bombing of Hengelo on 6 and 7 October 1944, killing several hundred people.

In addition, after World War II the synagogue that survived the war, an entire block called de Telgen, a monastery at the Thiemsbrug, the farm dating from the 17th century where Wolter ten Cate was born, and the 19th-century town hall were all demolished. This has also left the city without much of an historical centre.

One of the most prominent buildings is the Lambertusbasiliek, a Roman Catholic basilica built in 1890 devoted to Saint Lambert.

Climate
Like most of the Netherlands, Hengelo features an oceanic climate (Cfb in the Köppen classification); however, winters tend to be less mild than the rest of the Netherlands due to its inland location. Summer is also warmer than places near the coast. Although the former military airport is derelict and plans to revive the place were canceled in 2012, the weather station of the Royal Netherlands Meteorological Institute is still located there.

Notable events
On February 11, 1992, a Dutch F-16 crashed into the district Hasseler Es.
The Canadian rock band The Tragically Hip mention Hengelo in their song "At the Hundredth Meridian", where they "remember Hengelo" after a glorious gig in Metropool (concert hall in Hengelo).
The British indie rock band Spring Offensive on their first studio album "Young Animal Hearts" mention Hengelo in their song "Hengelo".

Twin cities
Hengelo is twinned with:

Education
Hengelo has seven high schools. These high schools are the Montessori College Twente, Bataafs Lyceum, Twickel College, Avila College, Gilde College, Grundel Lyceum, and the Grundel Parkcollege.

There is also an MBO school, ROC of Twente.

Notable residents

 Grada Hermina Marius (1854–1919), Dutch writer and painter
 Donald Zilversmit (1919–2010), U.S. nutritional biochemist, researcher and educator
 Herman Krebbers (1923–2018), Dutch violinist
 Theo Wolvecamp (1925-1992), avant-garde Dutch painter, member of Cobra
 Ernst van de Wetering (1938–2021), Dutch art historian and expert on Rembrandt
 Jacqueline de Jong (born 1939), Dutch painter, sculptor and graphic artist
 Ad Kolnaar (born 1942), Dutch economist and academic
 Deniz Kuypers, writer
 Hans Achterhuis (born 1942), philosopher and academic
 Sir Maarten Wevers, (born 1952), New Zealand civil servant and diplomat
 Henk Kamp (born 1952), retired Dutch politician
 Edward Reekers (born 1957), singer and voice actor, member of Kayak
 Willem Tanke (born 1959), organist and recitalist
 Ronald Ophuis (born 1968), Dutch artist

Sport 

 Jan van de Graaff (born 1944), retired Dutch rower, bronze medallist at the 1964 Summer Olympics
 Jan Olde Riekerink, (born 1963), football coach and former professional player
 Kirsten Vlieghuis (born 1976), Dutch freestyle swimmer, won two bronze medals at the 1996 Summer Olympics
 Niels Oude Kamphuis (born 1977), retired Dutch footballer, 278 club caps
 Joris Keizer (born 1979), Dutch butterfly swimmer, competed at the 2000 and 2004 Summer Olympics
 Gert-Jan Bruggink (born 1981), Dutch show jumping equestrian, competed at the 2004 Summer Olympics
 Joost Posthuma (born 1981), retired professional road bicycle racer
 Ninos Gouriye (born 1991), Assyrian-Dutch footballer
 Lucas van Foreest (born 2001), Dutch chess grandmaster, 2019 Dutch Chess Champion

Gallery

References

External links

Official Website

 
Cities in the Netherlands
Municipalities of Overijssel
Twente